Grace Toronto Church is a Presbyterian Church in America congregation worshipping in the historic Old St. Andrew's Church building at 383 Jarvis Street in Toronto, Ontario, Canada.

History of the building 
The original St. Andrew's Church congregation (of the Church of Scotland) dated back to 1830, when Toronto was still the Town of York. This congregation split in 1874 over whether it should move west from its home at the corner of Adelaide and Church streets. In 1876, the majority moved to a new site at King and Simcoe streets that became known as "New St. Andrew's", and it remains there to this day.

The church building at Adelaide and Church streets was renovated by Henry Langley in 1877–78. Those who wished to stay in that area remained with the "Old St. Andrew's" congregation. There was, however, a need for a new building, and in 1878, the congregation moved northeastward to a newly constructed church building at 383 Jarvis Street, on the corner of Carlton Street.

During the 1940s, the Soviet occupation of the Baltic states produced an influx of refugees from that area into Toronto. At the same time, the United Church of Canada, which Old St. Andrew's had joined in 1925, was in relative decline within the downtown core of Toronto. In 1950, Old St. Andrew's joined with Westminster-Central to become St. Andrew's United Church near the corner of Bloor Street East and Yonge Street.

By 1951, the Old St. Andrew's building on Jarvis Street was sold, and it became the main church of Toronto's Latvian and Estonian worshippers. Saint Andrew, as a renowned saint of the Christian Church, was retained in the name by the congregations. Until September 30, 2015, the church building remained home to two congregations of both the Estonian Evangelical Lutheran and Latvian Evangelical Lutheran Churches.

As of October 1, 2015, St. Andrew's became the new home of Grace Toronto Church. The historic building housed a Presbyterian congregation once again.

History of Grace Toronto Church 
Grace Toronto Church was founded in 1992 by Stephen Beck. During this time, the church flourished. In 2002, Beck and his family left to become missionaries in Germany, and attendance at Grace began to dwindle. In 2004, the Reverend Dan MacDonald became pastor of the church. The church was reduced to a handful of people in 2004, so Dan and Sue, under the guidance of the denomination, re-planted the church. The congregation was reduced to 10 people. In 2006, there were 25 regular attendees. Since 2006, the congregation has grown exponentially.

Beliefs 
 We believe the Bible is the written word of God, inspired by the Holy Spirit and without error in the original manuscripts. The Bible is the revelation of God’s truth and is infallible and authoritative in all matters of faith and practice.
 We believe in the Holy Trinity. There is one God, who exists eternally in three persons: the Father, the Son, and the Holy Spirit.
 We believe that all are sinners and totally unable to save themselves from God’s displeasure, except by his mercy.
 We believe that salvation is by God alone as he sovereignly chooses those he will save. We believe his choice is based solely on his grace, not on any human individual merit or on his foreknowledge of our faith.
 We believe that Jesus Christ is the eternal Son of God, who through his perfect life and sacrificial death atoned for the sins of all who will trust in him alone for salvation.
 We believe that God is gracious and faithful to his people, not simply as individuals, but as families in successive generations, according to his covenant promises.
 We believe that the Holy Spirit indwells God’s people and gives them the strength and wisdom to trust Christ and follow him.
 We believe that Jesus will return, bodily and visibly, to judge all mankind and to take his people to their eternal home.
 We believe that all aspects of our lives are to be lived to the glory of God under the lordship of Jesus Christ. - Adopted from https://web.archive.org/web/20151208030224/http://gracetoronto.ca/about-us/beliefs/
 The church is a member of the Presbyterian Church in America

Building details

Old St. Andrew's Church was built by Langley & Burke in 1878 for the Rev. M.G. Milligan and the remaining congregation of the original St. Andrew's Church. The building was designed in a Gothic style with a linear orientation on an East-West axis, with towers dominating the western side where the main entrances are located.

The facade is a simple-yet-elegant design featuring groupings of stained-glass windows on the north, east and south sides of the building, to allow maximum light exposure during the morning hours when services would take place. The materials used in the construction are brick, wood, stone and stained-glass.

The exterior shows mainly the brick and stone elements, while the interior reveals more of the warm wood texture complemented by the intimate lighting from the stained-glass windows. The approximate dimensions of the building are 36 meters by 25 meters for the body of the building, 17 meters high to the top of the pitched roof, and 46 meters and 25 meters to the tops of the two steeples.

References

External links
1886 Profile of Old St. Andrew's
Stained glass at St. Andrew's

Presbyterian churches in Toronto
Andrew's
Gothic Revival church buildings in Canada
19th-century Presbyterian church buildings in Canada
Presbyterian Church in America